Peter McLaughlin (born 1956) is an Irish academic, historian, and educator. He is the CEO of Max Learning Limited, the educational arm of the Max Group. He was Headmaster of The Doon School. Before joining Doon in 2009, he served as Headmaster of Douai School, and Principal of the British International School in Cairo and of Casterton School in England. McLaughlin retired from Doon in May 2016.

Education
McLaughlin was born in Northern Ireland and raised in Africa.  He was educated at Prince Edward School in Salisbury, Rhodesia, and at the University of Rhodesia, also in Salisbury, where he read history. He then studied for a Postgraduate Certificate in Education at the London School of Economics, United Kingdom.

Career
Lecturer in Modern history, University of Rhodesia, Salisbury, 1977–1983 (University of Zimbabwe from 1980, Harare from 1982)
Research fellow, London School of Economics, 1980–1983
Headmaster, Deputy Head, Housemaster and Teacher at St. George's College (HMC), Weybridge, Surrey 1983–1997
Headmaster of Douai School (HMC), 1997–1999
Headmaster of British International School in Cairo, Cairo, 1999–2005
Headmaster of Casterton School (GSA), Casterton, Cumbria, 2005–2009
Headmaster of The Doon School (HMC, IBSC), India, 2009–2016

Work

McLaughlin's doctorate was a study of the role of British Imperial defence policy in shaping the Rhodesian armed forces from the 1890s to the 1950s. During the Rhodesian Bush War, he served in operational areas as a field reservist in the British South Africa Police (BSAP). He set up the War Studies course at the University of Rhodesia (now the University of Zimbabwe) and was awarded an Association of Commonwealth Universities Post-doctoral Fellowship to the London School of Economics to study the British munitions industry in the First World War. He left the world of research and lecturing to carve out a successful career as a headmaster at major Private schools in England. From 1999 to 2005 he was the Principal of the British International School in Cairo before his departure to head Casterton School.

In 2009, McLaughlin moved to India to head an independent boarding school, The Doon School, succeeding Kanti Bajpai. He has lived in Dehradun in India ever since. In 2016, McLaughlin announced his early retirement from The Doon School with three years left on his second contract as Headmaster, and submitted his resignation to Chairman of the Board of Governors Gautam Thapar. He was succeeded by Matthew Raggett, a British educator.

Family
McLaughlin is married to Elizabeth McLaughlin and has two sons.

Bibliography
Ragtime Soldiers: The Rhodesian experience in The Great War (1980), by Peter McLaughlin. Books of Zimbabwe, .
The Occupation of Mashonaland (1982), by Peter McLaughlin. Books of Zimbabwe, .
The Rhodesian War: A Military History(2008), by Peter McLaughlin. Stackpole Books, .

References

Further reading
Peter McLaughlin The Rhodesian War
Interview with Peter McLaughlin in Daily News and Analysis newspaper, 5 September 2010
Views in The Tribune
News in Business Standard
McLaughlin in The Times of India newspaper

External links 
 Official Page

1956 births
Alumni of the London School of Economics
Alumni of Prince Edward School
British South Africa Police officers
Headmasters of The Doon School
British emigrants to Rhodesia
Historians from Northern Ireland
Academics from Northern Ireland
Male non-fiction writers from Northern Ireland
Living people
Rhodesian military personnel of the Bush War
Heads of schools in Egypt
Academic staff of the University of Zimbabwe
21st-century writers from Northern Ireland
White Rhodesian people
University of Zimbabwe alumni